JonBenét Patricia Ramsey (August 6, 1990 – December 25 or 26, 1996) was an American child beauty queen who was killed at the age of six in her family's home in Boulder, Colorado. A long handwritten ransom note was found in the home. Her father, John, found the girl's body in the basement of their house about seven hours after she had been reported missing. She had sustained a broken skull from a blow to the head and had been strangled; a garrote was found tied around her neck. The autopsy report stated that JonBenét's official cause of death was "asphyxia by strangulation associated with craniocerebral trauma". Her death was ruled a homicide. The case generated worldwide public and media interest, in part because her mother Patsy Ramsey, a former beauty queen, had entered JonBenét into a series of child beauty pageants. The crime is still considered a cold case and remains an open investigation with the Boulder Police Department.

The Boulder police initially suspected that the ransom note had been written by Patsy, and that the note and appearance of JonBenét's body had been staged by her parents in order to cover up the murder. In 1998, the police and district attorney (DA) both said that JonBenét's brother Burke, who was nine years old at the time of her death, was not a suspect. JonBenét's parents gave several televised interviews, but resisted police questioning except on their own terms. In October 2013, unsealed court documents revealed that a 1999 grand jury had recommended filing charges against the Ramseys for permitting the child to be in a threatening situation. John and Patsy were also accused of hindering the prosecution of an unidentified person who had "committed ... the crime of murder in the first degree and child abuse resulting in death". However, the DA determined that there was insufficient evidence to pursue a successful indictment.

In 2002, the DA's successor took over investigation of the case from the police and primarily pursued the theory that an intruder had committed the killing. In 2003, trace DNA that was taken from the victim's clothes was found to belong to an unknown male; each of the family's DNA had been excluded from this match. The DA sent the Ramseys a letter of apology in 2008, declaring the family was "completely cleared" by the DNA results. Others, including former Boulder police chief Mark Beckner, disagreed with exonerating the Ramseys, characterizing the DNA as a small piece of evidence that was not proven to have any connection to the crime. In February 2009, the Boulder police took the case back from the DA and reopened the investigation.

National and international media coverage of the case focused on JonBenét's brief beauty pageant career, as well as her parents' wealth and the unusual evidence found in the case. Media reports questioned how the police handled the investigation. Ramsey family members and their friends have filed defamation suits against several media organizations.

Life and interment

JonBenét Ramsey was born on August 6, 1990, in Atlanta, Georgia, the younger of two children of Patricia "Patsy" Ramsey (1956–2006) and John Bennett Ramsey (born 1943). She had an older brother named Burke (born 1987). JonBenét's first name combines her father's first and middle names, and her mother's first name was used as her middle name. She was enrolled in kindergarten at High Peaks Elementary School in Boulder, Colorado.

JonBenét's body was found on December 26, 1996, in her family's Boulder residence. She was buried at St. James Episcopal Cemetery in Marietta, Georgia, on December 31. JonBenét was interred next to her half-sister Elizabeth Pasch Ramsey, who had died in a car crash nearly five years earlier at age 22.

Parents
John Ramsey was a businessman who was the president of Access Graphics, a computer software company that later became a subsidiary of Lockheed Martin. His first marriage ended in divorce in 1978. John's two surviving adult children (a son and a daughter) lived elsewhere. In 1991, John had moved with Patsy, his second wife, and family to Boulder, where Access Graphics' headquarters was located.

Patsy Ramsey entered JonBenét in various child beauty pageants in Boulder, where she won the titles of America's Royale Miss, Little Miss Charlevoix, Little Miss Colorado, Colorado State All-Star Kids Cover Girl, and National Tiny Miss Beauty. JonBenét's active role in child beauty pageants and Patsy's reported "pageant mother" behavior were reported by the media after the murder.

In the summer of 1997—approximately six months after JonBenét's death—the Ramseys moved to a new home in Atlanta after a summer at their vacation retreat in Charlevoix, Michigan. Patsy died of ovarian cancer at age 49 in 2006; she was interred next to her daughter.

Evidence

Ransom note
According to statements that Patsy gave to authorities on December 26, 1996, she realized that her daughter was missing after she found a two-and-a-half-page handwritten ransom note on the kitchen staircase at the Ramsey family's Boulder residence. The note demanded . John pointed out to police first on the scene that the amount was nearly identical to his Christmas bonus of the prior year, which suggested that someone who would have access to that information would be involved in the crime. Investigators looked at several theories behind the dollar amount demanded, considering employees at Access Graphics who may have known of the amount of John's prior bonus. They also considered the possibility that the ransom demand was a reference to Psalm 118 and spoke to religious sources to determine possible relevance.

The ransom note appears to echo film dialog.  The films Ruthless People, Ransom, Escape from New York, Speed and Dirty Harry have acceptance as sources.

The ransom note was unusually long. The Federal Bureau of Investigation (FBI) told the police that it was very unusual for such a note to be written at the crime scene. The police believed that the note was staged, because it did not have any fingerprints except for Patsy's and authorities who had handled it, and because it included an unusual use of exclamation marks and initialisms. The note and a practice draft were written with a pen and notepad from the Ramsey home. According to a Colorado Bureau of Investigation (CBI) report, "There are indications that the author of the ransom note is Patricia Ramsey." However, the evidence fell short of a definitive conclusion. Michael Baden, a board-certified forensic pathologist, who had consulted with both sides of the case, said he had never seen a note like it in his 60-year experience and that he did not think it was written by an outside stranger.

A federal court ruled it highly unlikely that Patsy wrote the note, citing six certified handwriting experts. The court bemoaned the existence of self-proclaimed experts – without credentials – trying to enter the case by accusing Patsy without scientific basis.

911 call and initial search for the child
The only people known to be in the house on the night of JonBenét's death were her immediate family: Patsy and John Ramsey and their son Burke. The ransom note contained specific instructions against contacting police and friends, but Patsy telephoned the police at 5:52 a.m. MST. She also called family and friends. Two police officers responded to the 9-1-1 call and arrived at the Ramsey home within three minutes. They conducted a cursory search of the house but did not find any sign of forced entry.

Officer Rick French went to the basement and came to a door that was secured by a wooden latch. He paused for a moment in front of the door, but walked away without opening it. French later explained that he was looking for an exit route used by the kidnapper, which the closed inside peg ruled out. JonBenét's body was later found behind the door.

With JonBenét still missing, John made arrangements to pay the ransom. A forensics team was dispatched to the house. The team initially believed that the child had been kidnapped, and JonBenét's bedroom was the only room in the house that was cordoned off to prevent contamination of evidence. No precautions were taken to prevent contamination of evidence in the rest of the house. Meanwhile, friends, victim advocates, and the Ramsey family's minister arrived at the home to show support. Visitors picked up and cleaned surfaces in the kitchen, possibly destroying evidence. Boulder detective Linda Arndt arrived at about 8:00 a.m. MST, in anticipation of receiving further instructions by the kidnapper(s), but there was never an attempt by anyone to claim the money.

Discovery of the body
At 1:00 p.m. MST, Detective Arndt asked John Ramsey and Fleet White, a family friend, to search the house to see if "anything seemed amiss." They started their search in the basement. John opened the latched door which Officer French had overlooked and found his daughter's body in one of the rooms. JonBenét's mouth was covered with duct tape, a nylon cord was found around her wrists and neck, and her torso was covered by a white blanket. John picked up the child's body and took it upstairs. When JonBenét was moved, the crime scene was further contaminated, and critical forensic evidence was disturbed for the returning forensics team.

Each of the Ramseys provided handwriting, blood, and hair samples to the police. John and Patsy participated in a preliminary interview for more than two hours, and Burke was also interviewed within the first couple of weeks following JonBenét's death.

Autopsy
The autopsy revealed that JonBenét had been killed by strangulation and a skull fracture. The official cause of death was "asphyxia by strangulation associated with craniocerebral trauma." There was no evidence of conventional rape, although sexual assault could not be ruled out. Although no semen was found, there was evidence that there had been a vaginal injury. At the time of the autopsy, the pathologist recorded that it appeared her vaginal area had been wiped with a cloth. Her death was ruled a homicide.

A garrote that was made from a length of nylon cord and the broken handle of a paintbrush was tied around JonBenét's neck and had apparently been used to strangle her. Part of the bristle end of the paintbrush was found in a tub containing Patsy's art supplies, but the bottom third of it was never found despite extensive searching of the house by the police in subsequent days.

The autopsy revealed a "vegetable or fruit material which may represent pineapple," which JonBenét had eaten a few hours before her death. Photographs of the home taken on the day when JonBenét's body was found show a bowl of pineapple on the kitchen table with a spoon in it. However, neither John nor Patsy said they remembered putting the bowl on the table or feeding pineapple to JonBenét. Police reported that they found JonBenét's nine-year-old brother Burke Ramsey's fingerprints on the bowl. The Ramseys have always said that Burke slept through the entire night until he was awakened several hours after the police arrived.

Blood samples
In December 2003, forensic investigators extracted enough material from a mixed blood sample found on JonBenét's underwear to establish a DNA profile. That DNA belonged to an unknown male person, and excluded the DNA of each of the Ramseys. The DNA was submitted to the FBI's Combined DNA Index System (CODIS), a database containing more than 1.6 million DNA profiles, but the sample did not match any profile in the database. In October 2016, a report said that new forensic analysis with more sensitive techniques revealed that the original DNA contained genetic markers from two individuals other than JonBenét.

A. James Kolar, who was a lead investigator for the DA's office, said that there were additional traces of male DNA found on the cord and paintbrush that Boulder district attorney Mary Lacy did not mention, and that there were six separate DNA samples belonging to unknown individuals that were found by the test. Former FBI profiler Candice Delong believes that the DNA, having shown up identically in several different places on multiple surfaces, belongs to the killer. Former Adams County, Colorado, District Attorney Bob Grant, who has assisted the Boulder DA's office on the case for many years, also believes that the DNA evidence is significant, saying that any resolution of the case would have to explain how the DNA showed up on several pieces of JonBenét's clothing. Forensic pathologist Michael Baden said, "Trace amounts of DNA can get on places and clothing from all different, nonsuspicious means. There is no forensic evidence to show that this is a stranger murder."

Investigation
Experts, media commentators, and the Ramseys have identified potential suspects in the case. Boulder police initially focused almost exclusively upon John and Patsy, but by October 1997 had over 1,600 people in their index of persons of interest for the case.

Errors that were made in the initial investigation complicated the resolution of the investigation and applicable theory. Those errors included loss and contamination of evidence, lack of experienced and technical staff on the investigation, evidence shared with the Ramseys, and delayed informal interviews with the parents.

Lou Smit was a detective who came out of retirement in early 1997 to assist the Boulder County District Attorney's office with the case. In May 1998, he presented his findings to the Boulder police with other staff members of the DA's Office, concluding that the evidence pointed away from the Ramseys. They were unable to successfully challenge the police department's belief that the Ramseys were guilty. The DA's office sought to take control of the investigation. Due to the animosity between the police and the DA's office, and the pressure to obtain a conviction, Colorado governor Roy Romer interceded and named Michael Kane as special prosecutor to initiate a grand jury.

Two of the lead investigators in the case had opposing views. Both Lou Smit and Steve Thomas ultimately resigned — Smit because he believed that the investigation had incompetently overlooked the intruder hypothesis, and Thomas because the DA's office had interfered with and failed to support the police investigation of the case.

A grand jury was convened beginning September 15, 1998, to consider indicting the Ramseys for charges relating to the case. In 1999, the grand jury returned a true bill to charge the Ramseys with placing the child at risk in a way that led to her death and with obstructing an investigation of murder, based on the probable cause standard applied in such grand jury proceedings. But Boulder County District Attorney Alex Hunter did not prosecute them, because he did not believe that he could meet the higher standard of proving guilt beyond a reasonable doubt that is required for a criminal conviction.

Mary Lacy, the next Boulder County District Attorney, took over the investigation from the police on December 26, 2002. In April 2003, she agreed with a federal judge who sat on a 2002 libel case that evidence in the suit is "more consistent with a theory that an intruder murdered JonBenét than it was with a theory that Mrs. Ramsey did". On July 9, 2008, the Boulder District Attorney's office announced that, as a result of newly developed DNA sampling and testing techniques (touch DNA analysis), the Ramsey family members were excluded as suspects in the case. Lacy publicly exonerated the Ramseys.

On February 2, 2009, Boulder police chief Mark Beckner announced that Stan Garnett, the new Boulder County District Attorney, was turning the case over to his agency, and that his team would resume investigating it. Garnett found that the statute of limitations for the crimes identified in the 1999 grand jury true bill had expired, and did not pursue review of the case against the Ramseys.

In October 2010, the Boulder police reopened the cold case. New interviews were conducted following a fresh inquiry by a committee that included state and federal investigators. Police were expected to use the latest DNA technology in their investigation. There was no new information gleaned from those interviews. It was reported in September 2016 that the investigation into JonBenét's death continues to be an active homicide case, per Boulder Police Chief Greg Testa.

In 2015, Beckner disagreed with exonerating the Ramseys, stating, "Exonerating anyone based on a small piece of evidence that has not yet been proved to even be connected to the crime is absurd." He also stated that the unknown DNA from JonBenet's clothing "has got to be the focus of the investigation" at this point in time and that, until one can prove otherwise, "the suspect is the donator of that unknown DNA." In 2016, Gordon Coombes, a former investigator for the Boulder County District Attorney's office, also questioned total absolution of the Ramseys, stating, "We all shed DNA all the time within our skin cells. It can be deposited anywhere at any time for various reasons, reasons that are benign. To clear somebody just on the premise of touch DNA, especially when you have a situation where the crime scene wasn't secure at the beginning ... really is a stretch." Steven E. Pitt, a forensic psychiatrist hired by Boulder authorities, said, "Lacy's public exoneration of the Ramseys was a big slap in the face to Chief Beckner and the core group of detectives who had been working on the case for years."

Theories and suspects

Family member theory
There are two theories about the death of JonBenét. One is the family member theory. Boulder police initially concentrated almost exclusively upon the parents, John and Patsy Ramsey. According to Gregg McCrary, a retired profiler with the FBI, "statistically, it is a 12-to-1 probability that it's a family member or a care giver" who is involved in the homicide of a child. The police saw no evidence of a forced entry, but they did see evidence of staging of the scene, such as the ransom note. They did not find the Ramseys cooperative in helping them solve the death of their daughter. The Ramseys had said that their reluctance was due to their fear that there would not be a full investigation for intruders, and that they would be hastily selected as the key suspects in the case, according to the Daily Camera.

One theory is that Patsy struck JonBenét in a fit of rage after a bedwetting episode, and strangled her to cover up what had happened, after mistakenly thinking she was already dead. However, Patsy did not have a known history of uncontrolled anger. JonBenét's brother Burke Ramsey later said, "We didn't get spanked, nothing of the sort, nothing close, nothing near laying a finger on us, let alone killing your child."

Theoretically, the strangulation could have been a "red herring" aspect to conceal other elements of the assault and killing.

Burke, who was nine years old at the time of JonBenét's death, was interviewed by investigators at least three times. The first two interviews did not raise any concerns about him. A review by a child psychologist stated that it appeared that the Ramseys had "healthy, caring family relationships". In 1998, Boulder Police Chief Mark Beckner said during an interview with a news reporter that Burke Ramsey was not involved in the killing of his sister. In May 1999, the Boulder County District Attorney's office reiterated that Burke Ramsey was not a suspect. The investigators had never considered him a suspect.

The Ramseys offered a $100,000 reward in a newspaper ad dated April 27, 1997. Three days later, more than four months after the body of their daughter was found, they submitted for the first time to separate formal interviews at the Boulder County Justice Center.

In 1999, Colorado Governor Bill Owens spoke out, telling the Ramsey couple to "quit hiding behind their attorneys, quit hiding behind their PR firm".

A Colorado grand jury voted in 1999 to indict the parents. The indictment cited "two counts each of child abuse" and said the parents "did unlawfully, knowingly, recklessly and feloniously permit a child to be unreasonably placed in a situation that posed a threat of injury to the child's life or health, which resulted in the death of JonBenét Ramsey, a child under the age of sixteen."

Among the experts who testified in the case were DNA specialist Barry Scheck and forensic expert Henry Lee. On October 13, 1999, Alex Hunter, who was the district attorney at the time, refused to sign the indictment, saying that the evidence was insufficient for prosecution. The public thought that the grand jury investigation had been inconclusive. In 2002, the statute of limitations on the grand jury's charges expired.

The grand jury's vote to indict was not revealed publicly until October 25, 2013, when previously sealed court documents were released.

The Case of: JonBenét Ramsey, a show broadcast on CBS on September 18 and 19, 2016, used a group of experts to evaluate the evidence. The group theorized that Burke hit his sister in the head with a heavy object (possibly a flashlight) after she stole a piece of pineapple from his bowl, perhaps not intending to kill her. They suggested that the ransom letter was an attempt to cover up the circumstances of JonBenet's death. On behalf of Burke Ramsey, his counsel filed defamation lawsuits against CBS, the producers of the program, and several of its participants, based on many of its claims.

Intruder theory
The second theory is the intruder theory. The police and the prosecutors followed leads for intruders partly due to the unidentified boot mark left in the basement room where JonBenét's body was found. 

Early persons of interest included neighbor Bill McReynolds, who played Santa Claus; Chris Wolf, a local reporter whose then-girlfriend reported him as a suspect; family housekeeper Linda Hoffmann-Pugh; and a man named Michael Helgoth, who died in an apparent suicide shortly after JonBenét's death. Hundreds of DNA tests were performed to find a match to the DNA recovered during her autopsy. In a 2003 defamation lawsuit related to the case (Wolf v. Ramsey), involving the Ramseys publicly identifying an early suspect in the case, Judge Julie E. Carnes wrote: 
[T]here is virtually no evidence to support [Wolf's] theory that [the Ramseys] murdered their child, but abundant evidence to support [the Ramsey's] belief that an intruder entered their home at some point during the night of December 25, 1996 and killed their daughter.

Lou Smit, a detective in the case, assessed the evidence and concluded that an intruder had committed the crime. On the night JonBenét was killed, there had been two windows that were left slightly open to allow for electrical cords for the outside Christmas lights to pass through, a broken basement window, and one unlocked door. Smit's theory was that someone entered the Ramsey home through the broken basement window. Critics have questioned this theory, because there was an intact cobweb in the basement window. The steel grate that covered the window also had undisturbed cobwebs, and the foliage around the grate had been undisturbed. There were also cobwebs in the tracks of various windows, and dust and debris were on some sills. Smit believed that the intruder subdued JonBenét using a stun gun and took her down to the basement. JonBenét was killed and a ransom note was left. Smit's theory was supported by former FBI agent John E. Douglas, who had been hired by the Ramsey family.  Believing that the Ramseys were innocent, Smit resigned from the investigation on September 20, 1998, five days after the grand jury was convened against the Ramseys. While no longer an official investigator on the case, Smit continued to work on it until his death in 2010.

Author Stephen Singular in his book Presumed Guilty (1999, revised 2016)refers to consultations with cyber-crime specialists to argue JonBenét attracted the attention of child pornographers and pedophiles affiliated with the child pageant scene. Singular further believes the investigation was overly-focused on the Ramsey parents, hampering investigation into alternate scenarios, and the Ramseys were not responsible for the murder other than perhaps unwittingly exposing their daughter to sexual predators. Singular speculates this scenario explains why the grand jury did not recommend indicting the Ramsey parents for murder, but for child abuse or endangerment for placing their daughter in a risky situation.

It was determined that there had been more than 100 burglaries in the Ramseys' neighborhood in the months before JonBenét's murder. There were 38 registered sex offenders living within a  radius of the Ramseys' home. In 2001, former Boulder County prosecutor Trip DeMuth and Boulder County Sheriff's Detective Steve Ainsworth stated that there should be a more aggressive investigation of the intruder theory.

One of the individuals whom Smit identified as a suspect was Gary Howard Oliva, who was arrested for "two counts of attempted sexual exploitation of a child and one count of sexual exploitation of a child" charges in June 2016, according to Boulder's Daily Camera. Oliva, a registered sex offender, was publicly identified as a suspect in an October 2002 episode of 48 Hours Investigates.

The Killing of JonBenét: The Truth Uncovered, broadcast by A&E on September 5, 2016, concluded that an unidentified male was responsible for JonBenét's death, based on forensic DNA analysis of evidence. In the documentary, DNA and forensic scientist expert Lawrence Kobilinsky stated that "an unidentified male committed this crime".

The District Attorney's office investigating pedophiles indicated to former Denver prosecutor Craig Silverman that the District Attorney's office followed the intruder theory. The Ramseys developed a relationship with District Attorney Mary Lacy and her office, which was criticized by authorities such as the city's mayor, Leslie L Durgin. Silverman said, "Once you have conceded the possibility of an intruder, I don't see how any Ramsey could ever be successfully prosecuted." Gordon Coombes joined the office as an investigator under Lacy when they were testing JonBenét's clothing for touch DNA. He also said that Lacy strongly supported the intruder theory and talked about it with the staff. Although he was not directly involved with the case, he said he was told not to voice opposition to the theory because he might lose his job. "It just seemed weird the whole premise of ... this attempt to influence the entire agency," he stated.

False confession
Alexis Val Reich (then known as John Mark Karr) was arrested in Bangkok, Thailand on August 15, 2006 following a false confession to murdering JonBenét. Reich, a 41-year old school teacher, claimed to have drugged, sexually assaulted, and accidentally killed JonBenét.  According to CNN, "Authorities also said they did not find any evidence linking [Reich] to the crime scene."

In the confession, Reich had provided only basic facts that were publicly known and failed to provide any additional convincing details. The claim that JonBenét was drugged further cast doubt on the confession because the autopsy indicated no drugs were found in her body. Furthermore, Reich's DNA did not match DNA found on JonBenét's body.

On October 26, 2006, Reich sent an email to Bill Hammons of Bill's List seeking a literary agent to help "publish a manuscript that some might find controversial."

Reich later sent emails under numerous pen names, including Daxis the Conqueror, Drk Prnz, and Alexis. Reich later came out as transgender and changed her legal name from 'John Mark Karr' to Alexis Valoran Reich (or Delia Alexis Reich, according to a Washington State drivers' license). Samantha Spiegel (who gained a restraining order from Reich) alleged Reich only intended to undergo gender reassignment surgery to get closer to younger girls in a child sex cult called "The Immaculates".

Defamation lawsuits
Lin Wood, the Ramseys' family libel attorney, filed defamation lawsuits against several people and companies that had reported on the case, starting in 1999. They sued Star magazine and its parent company, American Media, Inc. on their son's behalf in 1999. Defamation suits have been filed by the Ramseys and their friends against several unnamed media outlets. A defamation suit was filed in 2001 against the authors and publisher of JonBenét: Inside the Ramsey Murder Investigation (2000). The suit against Don Davis, Steven Thomas, and St. Martin's Press was settled out of court the following year.

John and Patsy Ramsey were sued in two defamation lawsuits arising from the publication of their book, The Death of Innocence (2001). These suits were brought by two persons named in the book who were said to have been investigated by Boulder police as suspects in the case. The Ramseys were defended in those lawsuits by Lin Wood and three other Atlanta attorneys, James C. Rawls, Eric P. Schroeder, and S. Derek Bauer. They obtained the dismissal of both lawsuits.  U.S. District Court Judge Julie Carnes later concluded that "abundant evidence" in the murder case pointed to an intruder having committed the crime.

In November 2006, Rod Westmoreland, a friend of John Ramsey, filed a defamation suit against an anonymous web surfer who had posted two messages on Internet forums using the pseudonym "undertheradar" implicating Westmoreland in the murder.

During a September 2016 interview with CBS Detroit and in The Case of: JonBenét Ramsey documentary television program, forensic pathologist Werner Spitz accused Burke Ramsey of killing his sister. On October 6, 2016, Burke filed a defamation lawsuit against Spitz. Burke and his attorneys, who include Lin Wood, sought a total of $150 million in punitive and compensatory damages. Wood said he would also file a suit against CBS at the end of October 2016.

On December 28, 2016, Burke Ramsey's lawyers filed an additional civil lawsuit that accused CBS, the production company Critical Content LLC, and seven experts and consultants of defamation of character. They sought $250 million in compensatory damages and $500 million in punitive damages.

In January 2018, a judge denied the CBS motion to dismiss, and the suit was allowed to proceed. In January 2019, Wood announced that the lawsuit had been settled "to the satisfaction of all parties."

See also

 The Case of: JonBenét Ramsey
 Casting JonBenet
 Getting Away with Murder: The JonBenét Ramsey Mystery
 List of murdered American children

Explanatory notes

References

Further reading

Articles

Videos
 
 
 
 
 
 
 
 Netflix released a documentary on the case Casting JonBenet on April 28, 2017.

External links
 
 —index of articles from ABC News

American female models
1996 in Colorado
1996 murders in the United States
American murder victims
Deaths by person in Colorado
Deaths by strangulation in the United States
Deaths from head injury
December 1996 crimes
December 1996 events in the United States
Female murder victims
Incidents of violence against girls
 
Murder in Colorado
Unsolved murders in the United States